Grey Court School is a mixed-sex high school academy in Ham, in the London Borough of Richmond upon Thames. In September 2014, a new sixth form centre opened for Grey Court's founding sixth form students.

The school occupies a large acreage in Ham, with playing fields and tennis courts. The school's current head teacher is Christopher Rhodes.

Performance
As with other schools, latest exam results and related data are published in the Department for Education's national tables.

History

The school was opened in 1956 to provide education for the children of the newly constructed estate. The school was built in the grounds of the Georgian Grey Court House from which it took its name. The house itself was renamed Newman House after Cardinal Newman, who lived there as a child in the early 19th century.

In 2013, and again in 2018, the school was rated outstanding by Ofsted, having previously been satisfactory. The sixth form was included in Ofsted's  2018 inspection.

In March 2018, the sixth form building was named 'The True Building' after Lord True,  Conservative politician and former Leader of Richmond upon Thames Council.

Notable former pupils
 Ruby Bentall, actress 
 Andrew Gilligan, transport advisor to the Prime Minister, journalist and former London Cycling Commissioner 
Declan Rice, professional footballer

Gallery

External link
 Official website

References

1956 establishments in England
Academies in the London Borough of Richmond upon Thames
Ham, London
[[Category:Secondary schools in the London Borough of Richmond upon